Syed Ahmad Dehlvi (also written as Sayyid Aḥmad Dihlawī; 8 January 1846 – 11 May 1918) was an Indian Muslim scholar, linguist, lexicographer, philologist, educationist and an author of Urdu language. He compiled the Asifiya dictionary.

Biography
Syed Ahmad Dehlvi was born on 8 January 1846 in Delhi, Mughal India. He was the son of Hafiz Abd al-Rahman Mongheri, a descendant of Abdul Qadir Jilani.

Dehlvi assisted S W Fallon in dictionary projects between 1873 and 1879. He taught at Shahi Madrasa, located in the Arab Sarai, in Delhi. He was later appointed as a teacher of Urdu and Persian in the Municipal Board High School, in Himachal Pradesh. He was a fellow and examiner at University of the Punjab and served as the vice-manager of Government Book Depot in Lahore.

In 1914, Dehlvi was honored with the title of Khan Sahib by the Government of British India. He died on 11 May 1918.

Literary works
Dehlvi's works include:
 Farhang e Asifiya
 Hādi-un-Nisa
 Lughāt-un-Nisā
 ʻIlmullisān : yaʻnī, insān kī ibtidāʼī, darmiyānī aur ak̲h̲īr zabān
 Rusūm-i Dihlī
 Qiṣṣah-yi Mihr Afroz
 Munāẓirah-yi taqdīr-o-tadbīr, maʻrūf bih kunzulfavāʼid.
 Muhakama-e-Markaz-e-Urdu
 Muraqqa-e-Zuban-o-Bayan-e-Dehli

Legacy
Zahrah Jafri wrote Sayyid Aḥmad Dihlavī: ḥayāt aur kārnāme.

References

Bibliography
 

1846 births
1918 deaths
People from Delhi
Urdu-language writers
Linguists
Indian linguists by century